In addition to its ordinary English meaning, decorated can mean: 

In architecture, "Decorated", "Decorated Period", or "Decorated Gothic" is a period and style of mediaeval Gothic architecture.
 A person who has been awarded a military award or decoration is often said to have been "decorated".

See also
Decoration (disambiguation)